Allerton is a suburb of Liverpool, England. It has a number of large houses in the prestigious Calderstones Park area, with mainly 1930s semi-detached housing around the shopping area of Allerton Road. It is paired with Hunts Cross to form the Allerton and Hunts Cross city council ward, which had a population of 14,853 at the 2011 census.

History
In the Domesday Book, Allerton appears as Alretune, meaning "the alder enclosure". This was derived from the Old English alr, meaning "alder", and tún, meaning "enclosure or village". It was made an urban district by the Local Government Act 1894, and added to the county borough of Liverpool on 9 November 1913. Over the course of the 2010s, many new bars and restaurants opened on Allerton Road, increasing its popularity.

Education
New Heys
Calderstones School

Attractions
Allerton Cemetery
Allerton Hall
Allerton Park Golf Club
Allerton Tower Park
Calderstones Park (formerly the grounds of Calderstones House)
Clarke Gardens
The Parish Church of All Hallows

Transport
Allerton is served by two railway stations: Liverpool South Parkway on the border of Allerton and Garston (with the railway track separating the two suburbs) and West Allerton. Both stations offer services to Liverpool city centre and Manchester, but Liverpool South Parkway also has services to Southport and Hunts Cross (on Merseyrail's Northern Line) and also the fast service to Birmingham. The former Allerton railway station has been replaced by Liverpool South Parkway, although the old platforms are in use at the new station.

The nearest major bus stop is at Liverpool South Parkway, with the 86 service to the city centre and bus shuttles to Liverpool John Lennon Airport. There are several bus stops around Aigburth with links to various districts throughout the city and also the city centre.

Notable people
Peter Adamson, actor
Saint John Almond, priest
Hollie Cavanagh, singer
Bill Kenwright, theatre producer
Sadio Mané, footballer 
Paul McCartney, musician
Hugh O'Leary, accountant, husband of UK Prime Minister Liz Truss
John Power, musician
William Roscoe, banker and lawyer

Cultural references
The Beatles' song "Penny Lane" is set mostly on Allerton Road; the shelter in the middle of the roundabout, the barber shop, and possibly the bank mentioned in the song are all located at the junction of Allerton Road, Penny Lane, and Smithdown Road.

Allerton is featured in the first episode of the BBC drama series Spooks, in which pro-life campaigners detonate a bomb outside the home of a family planning doctor.

References

Bibliography
Liverpool District Placenames, Henry Harrison, 1898

Notes

External links

 Liverpool Street Gallery - Liverpool 18
 

Areas of Liverpool

sv:Allerton